The Taylor's Ford Bridge is a historic structure located four miles southeast of Independence, Iowa, United States. In January 1872 the Buchanan County Board of Supervisors contracted with the Wrought Iron Bridge Co. from Canton, Ohio, to build a two-span bridge in the city of Independence for $20,102. It had replaced an earlier span that had been washed away in a flood. Both spans were replaced by a heavier span in 1891. One of the spans was moved to Buffalo Township, and has subsequently been removed. This bridge is the other span. It has been replaced a second time by a heavier bridge, but it remains in place even though it no longer carries vehicle traffic. The bridge was listed on the National Register of Historic Places in 1998.

References

Bridges completed in 1872
Bridges in Buchanan County, Iowa
National Register of Historic Places in Buchanan County, Iowa
Road bridges on the National Register of Historic Places in Iowa
Truss bridges in Iowa
Wrought iron bridges in the United States